Hamida Ghafour is a Canadian journalist and author of Afghan origin.

Biography
Ghafour was born in Kabul in 1977 and is named after her grandmother who was a writer and social reformer. Ghafour and her parents fled Afghanistan in 1981, when she was four years old, due to the Soviet–Afghan War. In 1985 the family settled in Toronto. In 2003 she returned to Afghanistan as a journalist working for The Daily Telegraph, covering the reconstruction of Afghanistan. She has also worked for Unreported World on Channel 4. She lives in London since 2001.

Bibliography
The Sleeping Buddha (2007). London: Constable and Robinson / Toronto: McArthur & Company.  (Hardcover);  (Paperback).

References

External links
Transcript of an interview conducted by Richard Fidler for the Australian Broadcasting Company
Hamida Ghafour's profile on United Agents
Article: "My countrymen called me a prostitute", Afghanistan Peace Organization, 26 October 2004
Channel 4 - Unreported World: "Bolivia: Anarchy in the Andes" (Series 2007, Episode 4)

1977 births
Afghan emigrants to Canada
Living people
Journalists from Toronto
People from Kabul